Syntar Klas Sunn (10 December 1958 – 10 September 2021) was an Indian politician from Meghalaya. He was a member of the United Democratic Party.

He was elected from East Khasi Hills district's Mawphlang assembly constituency of Meghalaya in 2018 as an Independent politician but later joined United Democratic Party.

References

1958 births
2021 deaths
United Democratic Party (Meghalaya) politicians
People from East Khasi Hills district
Meghalaya MLAs 2018–2023
Deaths from the COVID-19 pandemic in India